eBay has experienced controversy, including cases of fraud, its policy requiring sellers to use PayPal, and concerns over forgeries and intellectual property violations in auction items.

Fraud
eBay Customer Support claims that its data indicate that less than 0.1% of all transactions result in a confirmed case of fraud. One mechanism eBay claims combats fraud is its feedback system. When a user feels that a seller or buyer has been dishonest, a dispute can be filed with eBay. An eBay seller may be suspended if there are too many complaints made against them. eBay does not allow sellers to give negative feedback to buyers, but did at one time.

Until June 2008, eBay allowed Mystery Box and Mystery Envelope auctions. However, these are almost all fraudulent auctions since the seller can manipulate the box contents to make sure it is never a good deal for the buyer. Mystery Envelope auctions offer cash prizes of an undisclosed amount to auction winners. The auction winner usually receives from 10% to 30% of the money he paid for the auction back in 'winnings'.

Many complaints have been made about eBay's system of dealing with fraud, leading to its being featured on the British consumer rights television program Watchdog. It is also regularly featured in The Daily Mirror'''s Consumer Awareness page. The complaints are generally that eBay fails to respond when a claim is made.

Frauds that can be committed by sellers include:
 selling counterfeit merchandise – see below;
 shill bidding - see section below for more details;
 selling bootleg merchandise;
 receiving payment and not shipping merchandise;
 shipping items other than those described;
 giving a deliberately misleading description and/or photo;
 knowingly and deliberately shipping faulty merchandise;
 denying warranty exchange after pre-agreeing to RMA of DOA merchandise;
 knowingly selling stolen goods;
 misrepresenting the cost of shipping;
 using bulk shipping prices to knowingly mask much higher costing, individual return shipping
 using pseudo-accounts to make high nonpaying bids on similar items that competitors are selling

Frauds committed by buyers include:
 PayPal fraud, namely filing a false shipping damage claim with the shipping company and with PayPal;
 Friendly fraud: receiving merchandise and claiming otherwise;
 returning items other than received;
 Removing parts from an item and returning it for a refund;
 the buyer sending a forged payment-service e-mail that states that he or she has made a payment to the seller's account (an unsuspecting seller may ship the item before realizing that the e-mail was forged);
 making a low bid then using pseudo-accounts to make high nonpaying bids in an attempt at gaining a low second chance offer price.
 damaging the item received in order to get a refund by claiming the seller sent the item already damaged (typically seen with buyers remorse)
 FTID scam, in which the return package is filled with garbage and sent to the wrong address

Fraud is prevented by:
 third-party businesses compiling lists of stolen goods from local authorities and businesses so eBay consumers can check to see whether the goods they are buying are stolen;
 third-party software that could potentially eliminate eBay account hijacking by alerting users if they are being tricked into going to a bogus, or "spoofed" website (see anti-phishing).

Shill bidding
Shill bidding is undisclosed vendor bidding that is used to artificially inflate the price of a certain item. It is usually carried out with "shill" account(s), by either the seller under an alternate account or another person in collusion with the seller. Shill bidding is prohibited by eBay. However, eBay has been criticized for not doing enough to combat the problem. Still, there are techniques, like sniping, which let buyers avoid shill bidders.

Forgeries
It is estimated that about a quarter of all ancient coins and about two-thirds of all antiquities sold on eBay are modern forgeries. In March 2008, Professional Coin Grading Service issued an alert noting counterfeit PCGS slabs and various United States and Chinese coins originating from the People's Republic of China being sold on eBay.

In court papers introduced by attorney for jeweler Tiffany & Co., it was claimed that researchers for Tiffany had determined that over 70% of the Tiffany silver jewelry offered for sale on eBay was fake. Tiffany & Co. filed a lawsuit against eBay in 2004 which claimed that eBay profited from the sales of counterfeit Tiffany items that infringed on its trademark. On July 14, 2008, a Federal District Court judge ruled that eBay does not have a legal responsibility to monitor users selling counterfeit items. In 2010, the Second Circuit affirmed this decision (see Tiffany v. eBay).

Feedback system
eBay does allow buyers to rate any seller using a feedback system that allows positive, neutral, and negative comments. However, sellers are prohibited from leaving anything other than positive feedback for buyers.
Before eBay's January 29, 2008, policy-change announcement, at the end of every transaction, both the buyer and seller had the option of rating each other. Both parties had the ability to rate each other and the experience as a "positive", "negative", or "neutral" rating and leave a comment no longer than 80 characters. As of CEO's John Donahoe's announcement however, the option for sellers to leave anything other than positive feedback to buyers (in response to an outcry from buyers who received negative feedback in retaliation for leaving the seller a negative) was removed.

According to critics, weaknesses of the feedback system include:
 Small and large transactions carry the same weight in the feedback summary. It is therefore easy for a dishonest user to initially build up a deceptive positive rating by buying or selling a number of very low value items, such as e-books, recipes, etc., then subsequently switch to fraud. eBay has since restricted digitally-delivered items to classified listings, which do not involve feedback.
 Sellers can also attempt to boost their own feedback by buying their own items with alias accounts, and leaving positive feedback for their main selling account.
 Sellers can request feedback be removed and eBay will sometimes do so. This means that when one looks at a particular member, they may be reported as 100% feedback, but this may be inaccurate as it does not include feedback eBay has decided to remove
 When eBay removes feedback, the buyer is not informed and no chance to alter it is provided. eBay will not even inform the buyer as to why it has been removed once they find out.

Intellectual property in auctions
Holders of intellectual property rights have claimed that eBay profits from the infringement of intellectual property rights. The company responded by creating the Verified Rights Owner (VeRO) program, which provides to rights holders auction takedowns and private information on eBay users on demand.
 In September 2005, eBay's privacy practices relating to its VeRO program came under scrutiny when South Bend, Indiana-based television station WNDU-TV reported that the Embroidery Software Protection Coalition was accusing American buyers, identified by eBay, of copyright infringement, and demanding monetary settlements. eBay's privacy policy warns that eBay may disclose personal information on the request of any VeRO rights holder investigating illegal activity, although according to a University of Notre Dame law professor, there is no legal basis, in the United States, for copyright infringement claims against buyers.
 Some manufacturers have abused eBay's VeRo program, through which copyright and trademark owners can quickly protect their rights, by seeking to prevent all sales of their products on eBay.
 In November 2006, the English High Court ruled that a VeRO rights holder's takedown request to eBay constituted a legal threat under design patent law. Since groundless legal threats under design patent law are unlawful, the ruling holds that groundless VeRO takedown requests based on design patents are also unlawful. Further, the text of the ruling appears critical of the VeRO program in general: "It is entirely wrong for owners of intellectual property rights to attempt to assert them without litigation, or without the threat of litigation, in reply."
 On June 4, 2008, a court in Troyes, France awarded luxury goods maker Hermes damages of US$30,000 as a result of the sale of two counterfeit Hermes bags on eBay in 2006. The court also ordered eBay to run a statement reporting the court case on the home page of eBay's French website for three months.
 On June 29, 2008, a court in Paris, France awarded damages of 40 million euros (US$63 million) to luxury goods group LVMH over eBay auctions of counterfeit bags, perfumes, and other items. The plaintiffs further alleged that auctions of legitimate perfumes were also illegal because, they claim, only authorized resellers are permitted to sell them, and authorized resellers are not permitted to sell on eBay. The court agreed, entering a permanent injunction against eBay auctions of LVMH perfumes, whether counterfeit or not. eBay announced that French users would be barred from buying or selling LVMH perfumes and cosmetics on any of eBay's sites.
 In July 2008, a United States court decided a trademark infringement lawsuit by jeweler Tiffany & Co. in eBay's favor: "It is the trademark owner's burden to police its mark, and companies like eBay cannot be held liable for trademark infringement based solely on their generalized knowledge that trademark infringement might be occurring on their websites." eBay advertises and profits from the sale of Tiffany products through its site, while Tiffany claims that no third-party resellers are authorized to sell Tiffany jewelry. Despite eBay's efforts to find and cancel illegal listings, many "Tiffany" listings are judged by buyers or by Tiffany to be counterfeit. The judgment specifies that eBay's advertising of the availability of Tiffany products on its site is a protected fair use of Tiffany's trademark, that eBay sufficiently protects buyers by canceling auctions reported to the VeRO program as believed to be infringing and that eBay is not obligated to suspend sellers reported to VeRO without further evidence of infringement.
 In October 2008, Alan UK, manufacturers and importers of CB, Amateur, and PBR radio equipment, announced to their official resellers that they planned to use their VeRO status to remove all listings of products bearing their brands (Midland, Alan, Albrecht et al.) listed in 'new' condition. They blamed this on refurbished equipment and grey imports being sold as new on eBay. After an outcry from both consumers and their resellers alike, they later changed the scheme to give each official reseller a numbered ID to be shown in the listings. It is unclear where this policy stands in November 2011, as some sellers still show the ID, whereas some do not. The Alan UK website still has a signup page for the approved dealer scheme, stating that "We do not support eBay only stores or businesses."

eBay requires sellers to use PayPal
In some countries, eBay requires sellers to offer the PayPal payment service, which was formerly owned by eBay's parent company. eBay stated that this mandate was due to the safety and security of the service. However, critics contended that the requirement was meant to leverage their former co-ownership, as eBay would receive service fees, on top of transaction fees via PayPal for product and shipping payments.

Although, since July 2015, PayPal and eBay have operated as separate companies, a five-year agreement between the two companies contractually requires that PayPal serve at least 80% of eBay transactions. In August 2015, eBay announced that it would ban the use of competing services Propay and Skrill effective September 27, 2015, citing low usage. However, critics argued that the change was meant to comply with eBay's requirement to maintain the integrity of the PayPal service.

Australia
In April 2008 eBay announced an introduction of a 'PayPal only' policy in Australia. The new policy would have meant that sellers will only be able to offer PayPal or cash payment on pick-up as payment methods. eBay claims that PayPal is the most secure method of payment.

Under the Australian Trade Practices Act 1974, it is unlawful for a company to require the use of a third party's products or services in order for a person to deal with the company, known as Third Line Forcing. eBay submitted a notification under the Act, which provides automatic exemption from this provision unless the notification is subsequently revoked by the Australian Competition & Consumer Commission (ACCC).

As part of its assessment of the notification, the ACCC called for submissions from interested parties. This attracted a record number of complaints from eBay members, banks, Google, and members of the business community and the Reserve Bank of Australia. During this period, rival auction site OZtion experienced a record number of new members.

The ACCC completed an initial draft proposal to revoke eBay's notification, stating that it believed consumers were in a better position to judge risk on individual transactions than eBay's management and has ruled the plan anti-competitive. However, before a final decision could be announced on July 3, 2008, eBay announced that it had withdrawn the notification to the ACCC and shelved its "PayPal only" plans.

United Kingdom
A similar policy requiring sellers to offer PayPal was also introduced in the United Kingdom, though in stages. The first stage, which was adopted on March 25, 2008, was aimed at sellers with feedback scores under 100 and in certain high risk categories. The requirement was extended to all sellers from June 3, 2008.

Other eBay controversies
Other notable controversies involving eBay include:
 On May 28, 2003, a U.S. District Court jury found eBay guilty of willful patent infringement and ordered the company to pay $35 million in damages. The plaintiff was MercExchange, who had accused eBay in 2000 of infringing on three patents, one of which is used in eBay's "Buy It Now" feature for fixed-price sales which accounts for 30% of eBay's business. The decision was appealed to the U.S. Court of Appeals for the Federal Circuit (CAFC). The CAFC affirmed the judgment of willful infringement, and reversed the lower court and granted a permanent injunction. eBay appealed the permanent injunction to the U.S. Supreme Court, which on May 15, 2006 found an injunction is not required nor automatic in this or any patent case where guilt has been established. The case was sent back to the Virginia district court for consideration of the injunction and a trial on another MercExchange patent the inventor claims covers the remaining 70 percent of eBay's business model (see eBay Inc. v. MercExchange, L.L.C. ). This case has been particularly controversial since the patents involved are considered to be business method patents (see Software patent debate).
 On July 28, 2003, eBay and its subsidiary PayPal agreed to pay a $10 million fine to settle allegations that they aided illegal offshore and online gambling. According to the settlement, between mid-2000 and November 2002, PayPal transmitted money in violation of various U.S. federal and state online gambling laws. eBay's announcement of its acquisition of PayPal in early July said that PayPal would begin the process of exiting this market, and was already doing so when the ruling occurred. These offenses occurred prior to eBay's purchase of PayPal.
 In late 2006, eBay effected a policy change which showed less information about bidders once auctions reached a certain value. This policy has been criticized for making shill bidding much harder to detect, to the potential disadvantage of buyers and significant advantage to unethical sellers who may artificially inflate the price of an auction. An investigation by The Sunday Times in January 2007 uncovered substantial evidence of shill bidding on eBay.
 An April 2007 lawsuit in California over monopoly practices.
 On January 29, 2008, a series of new policy changes were announced including an increase in the final value fee and a decrease in the listing fee (when averaged out, the fees actually cost sellers more). Among the more controversial moves was the announcement that sellers would soon only be able to leave positive feedback for buyers, and would no longer have the ability to provide negative or neutral ratings regardless of the experience. The policies also had greater benefits for qualified sellers. eBay gave "Powersellers" a 5% to 20% discount on the final value fees. These sellers also received preferential positioning in search results.
 In July 2008, eBay started letting web retailer Buy.com list millions of items for sale on eBay without having to pay the listing fees required of other sellers. Its account also highlights eBay's flawed Detailed-Seller-Rating system as Buy.com's eBay account, which was changed in December 2007 to "buy" via a name usurpation, always gives free shipping and yet has a 4.8 Rating on "shipping charges," which is below the amount required for the 15% powerseller discount.
 In January 2010, David Davidson from Droitwich, Worcestershire received tabloid attention in the United Kingdom after eBay withdrew his listing of a Dad's Army'' board game. eBay claimed that, as the box graphics contained images of swastikas, it was Nazi paraphernalia and, as such, breached the firm's offensive material policy. Members of the tabloid press criticised eBay's decision, claiming that they had divorced the images from its original context of a family friendly prime-time sitcom to pander to political correctness. Davidson was told he would be able to relist the item if he removed any images showing the swastika on the box.
 The American Internal Revenue Service and other governmental taxing agencies suspect that on many eBay transactions, the sellers are failing to report income and/or sales tax as required by law. Canada Revenue Agency filed suit against eBay Canada and in 2007, the Federal Court of Canada ruled that eBay Canada must provide the requested information. The Court of Appeal upheld that decision and in 2008, eBay Canada began providing names and sales data for its largest sellers. In the United Kingdom Her Majesty's Revenue and Customs issues guidance on whether selling on eBay constitutes trading and so is liable for tax; in general selling chattels is not regarded as trading.
 On December 4, 2010, eBay subsidiary PayPal decided to freeze the account of WikiLeaks citing terms of use violations over the publication of leaked US diplomatic cables, inviting allegations that PayPal did so in response to US government pressure. In response, a hacker group called Anonymous launched denial-of-service attacks against the main PayPal site.
In March 2020, eBay was urged to clamp down on price gouging household essentials which were in short supply as a result of panic buying during the COVID–19 coronavirus pandemic. One UK-based seller selling Andrex toilet paper at £50 each (twice the retail price) and another was selling a 72-pack of toilet roll at £99.90 (quadruple its retail price). These items and others such as these were later removed from sale.
On March 2, 2021, the estate of Dr. Seuss announced that six of its books would be removed from sale or only sold in a modified form over concerns that some of their images were racially insensitive. This ignited a surge of interest in the discontinued books on eBay and other auction sites. However, an eBay spokesperson stated that the company was "sweeping [its] marketplace to remove these items" and several users reported that they had been prevented from trying to list copies.

eBay Motors class action lawsuit
On July 27, 2010, the Court allowed the individual plaintiffs Yingling and Scott to represent all persons who paid so-called Final Value Fees in conjunction with a listing of an item within eBay, Inc.'s defined category of "Parts & Accessories" on the eBay Motors website, which listing was placed between April 21, 2005, and August 26, 2009. This ruling allowed the law firm of Figari & Davenport LLP to act as "Class Counsel" and to represent the Class Members as their attorneys. The Court's ruling does not mean that the Court views the claims in this Lawsuit as having merit or not.

The case was settled in 2011. This Settlement applies to the same persons defined above; however, all listings made using eBay's Store Inventory Format are excluded from the Settlement.
"Payment to Settlement Class members will be proportional to the total amount of Final Value Fees (net of any previous refunds) each Class Member paid between April 21, 2005 and August 26, 2009 for selling Parts and Accessories, excluding listings in eBay Store Inventory Format. According to eBay’s calculations, which are subject to finalization and revision, it is estimated that Settlement Class Members will be refunded approximately 6.67% of the Final Value Fees (net of any previous refunds) they paid for these listings."

References

EBay
Ebay
Ebay